Silkypix Developer Studio is commercial and proprietary raw image processing software. It is often bundled with cameras from manufacturers such as Fujifilm, Panasonic and Pentax.

External links
Version 9 press release
Review by Photography Blog
Review by ePhotozine
Review by Techradar

Raster graphics editors
Raw image processing software